
In linear algebra, a square matrix with complex entries is said to be skew-Hermitian or anti-Hermitian if its conjugate transpose is the negative of the original matrix. That is, the matrix  is skew-Hermitian if it satisfies the relation

where  denotes the conjugate transpose of the matrix .  In component form, this means that

Skew-Hermitian matrices can be understood as the complex versions of real skew-symmetric matrices, or as the matrix analogue of the purely imaginary numbers.  The set of all skew-Hermitian  matrices forms the  Lie algebra, which corresponds to the Lie group U(n). The concept can be generalized to include linear transformations of any complex vector space with a sesquilinear norm.

Note that the adjoint of an operator depends on the scalar product considered on the  dimensional complex or real space .

Imaginary numbers can be thought of as skew-adjoint (since they are like  matrices), whereas real numbers correspond to self-adjoint operators.

Example
For example, the following matrix is skew-Hermitian

because

Properties
 The eigenvalues of a skew-Hermitian matrix are all purely imaginary (and possibly zero). Furthermore, skew-Hermitian matrices are normal. Hence they are diagonalizable and their eigenvectors for distinct eigenvalues must be orthogonal.
 All entries on the main diagonal of a skew-Hermitian matrix have to be pure imaginary; i.e., on the imaginary axis (the number zero is also considered purely imaginary).
  is skew-Hermitian if and only if  (or equivalently) is Hermitian.
 is skew-Hermitian if and only if the real part  is skew-symmetric and the imaginary part  is symmetric.
 If  is skew-Hermitian, then  is Hermitian if  is an even integer and skew-Hermitian if  is an odd integer.
  is skew-Hermitian if and only if  for all vectors .
 If  is skew-Hermitian, then the matrix exponential  is unitary.
 The space of skew-Hermitian matrices forms the Lie algebra  of the Lie group .

Decomposition into Hermitian and skew-Hermitian
 The sum of a square matrix and its conjugate transpose  is Hermitian.
 The difference of a square matrix and its conjugate transpose  is skew-Hermitian. This implies that the commutator of two Hermitian matrices is skew-Hermitian.
 An arbitrary square matrix  can be written as the sum of a Hermitian matrix  and a skew-Hermitian matrix :

See also
 Bivector (complex)
 Hermitian matrix
 Normal matrix
 Skew-symmetric matrix
 Unitary matrix

Notes

References
 .
 .

Matrices
Abstract algebra
Linear algebra